Rohan Murdock (born 27 February 1992) is an Australian professional boxer.

Personal life
Murdock was born in Perth but moved to the Gold Coast at a young age.

Professional boxing career
Murdock made his professional debut in his hometown of the Gold Coast, Australia on 4 December 2010 defeating John Noctor via first-round knockout (KO). He suffered his first and only loss against Steven Moxon via majority decision (MD) on 6 March 2011. Since the loss, he has compiled 19 consecutive victories with 12 KOs. He is scheduled to fight Frankie Filippone on 3 February 2018 in Corpus Christi, Texas. Should Murdock win, there are plans in place to host WBO champion Gilberto Ramirez in his hometown of the Gold Coast in a bout to take place on the beach.

Professional boxing record

References

External links

1992 births
Living people
Australian male boxers
Sportspeople from the Gold Coast, Queensland
Super-middleweight boxers